Geoffrey Audus Nicholson Hirst TD (14 December 1904 – 18 June 1984) was a British industrialist and politician who was a maverick Conservative Member of Parliament.

Early career
Hirst, from a Yorkshire military family, was educated at Charterhouse School and St John's College, Cambridge. He went into industry, becoming President of the Leeds Chamber of Commerce; he was also Chairman of the East and West Ridings Yorkshire Regional Council of the Federation of British Industries.

Parliament
During the Second World War, Hirst served with the Royal Artillery (he had been a member of the Territorial Army before it). At the 1950 general election, Hirst was elected as Conservative Member of Parliament for Shipley. He remained on the backbenches, although he did become Chairman of the Conservative Parliamentary Trade and Industry Committee. He often raised the issue of the textiles industry.

Political activities
Hirst was a right-winger and supported an aggressive policy over the Suez Canal in 1956. When the Treasury Ministers Peter Thorneycroft, Enoch Powell and Nigel Birch resigned in 1958 after failing to win backing for spending cuts, Hirst said he was considering resigning the Conservative whip in sympathy with them. He did not go through with this idea, but his constituency association gave backing to him.

In June 1963, Hirst called for "a new and younger leadership" for the government before the next general election, an indirect call for Harold Macmillan to resign. During the Alec Douglas-Home government, Hirst objected to Edward Heath's bill to abolish resale price controls, and jibed that the reason the negotiations for the United Kingdom to join the European Economic Community had failed was that there was no room in Europe for two de Gaulles.

Resigning the whip
With Heath as Conservative Party leader after 1965, Hirst became even more disillusioned. Following the 1966 general election, he launched a single-handed campaign against the Wilson government's Prices and Incomes Bill. On 10 July 1966 he announced that he would no longer receive the Conservative whip because the party would not vote against the Bill. He sat through the rest of the Parliament as an Independent Conservative, but did not attempt to retain his seat at the 1970 general election.

References

Sources 
M. Stenton and S. Lees, Who's Who of British MPs, Vol. IV (Harvester Press, 1981)
The Times.

External links 
 

1904 births
1984 deaths
Alumni of St John's College, Cambridge
Conservative Party (UK) MPs for English constituencies
People educated at Charterhouse School
Royal Artillery officers
UK MPs 1950–1951
UK MPs 1951–1955
UK MPs 1955–1959
UK MPs 1959–1964
UK MPs 1964–1966
UK MPs 1966–1970